Daniel Bremer Juell Koren (1858–1948) was a Norwegian civil servant and politician.  He served as the County Governor of Vest-Agder county from 1907 until 1928 and also as the last Diocesan Governor of Kristiansand from 1907 until 1919 when that office was abolished.

References

1822 births
1906 deaths
County governors of Norway